Marco Patuano (born 6 June 1964) is an Italian economist, manager and President of A2A.

Education 
Patuano studied Corporate Finance and graduated from Bocconi University, in Milan, Italy, in 1990. He then proceeded his studies with numerous post-graduate specializations.
Over time he maintained a good relationship with Italian universities, collaborating on MBA programs with Bocconi University of Milan and Luiss University of Rome.

Career in telecom 
Patuano started his career in SIP, the former name of Telecom Italia in 1990
working in the financial branch of the company.
He helped to create the branch Telecom Italia Mobile in 1996. Marco Patuano's was nominated TIM Brasil CFO and Telecom Italia America Latina S.A. CFO, they are both Telecom Italia subsidiaries. He was nominated Telecom Italia CFO in 2008. He joined the council of  Confindustria since May 2013.

On 14 April 2017 he became a director of A.C. Milan. He became the Senior Advisor of Nomura's European investment banking business in 2019.

Career post-telecom

Edizione Holding 
On the 7th of October of the same year he is nominated as CEO of Edizione srl, financial holding of the Benetton Family, which he then guides up to June 2019, when his natural mandate expired. Throughout the three years of guiding the company the group carries out many international operations within M&A, reducing its portfolio of investments in Italy from 74% to 39% and diversifying it. In the period in question, 2.4 Bln € were invested, with a MAV growth equal to 1.5 Bln €.

Throughout the Edizione experience he also covers the following offices:
 Board Member of Atlantia
 Board Member of Autogrill
 Board Member of Benetton
 Board Member of Edizione Property
 President of Cellnex

Simultaneously on the 14th of April, 2017 Patuano enters in the board of directors of AC Milan, after the change of ownership from Fininvest to Li. Yonghong. In 2018, with the enforcement of the pledge by Elliott on AC Milan and the subsequent change of ownership, Patuano is confirmed within the board.

MP Invest 
In September 2019, Patuano founds a new holding for consulting and investing called "MP Invest".
The Social objective of MP Invest is to "consult financially, directionally, organizationally and management, with a main focus on the financial, industrial, infrastructural, media and technologies sectors". The company exerts also activities of holding acquisitions and management of participations.
The main client base are companies and hedge funds of private equity, whom they support and help individuate investment opportunities.

A2A 
On May 13, 2020, he is nominated as President of the A2A Group.

Critics 
In 2014 the company that he manages since 2011, Telecom Italia, has a consolidated net profit of 1 billion euros, an adjusted net financial debt of 26 billion euros, revenues for 21 billion euros and the EBIT amounted to 4 billion euros.

Digital communications 
Patuano has been present on Twitter ever since June 2011 with an institutional certified profile, first of all Italian top managers to have one. He used many times the practice of Twitter Time,  moment when you declare yourself open to answer questions from the public: first time on June 10, 2011, and then on many other occasions, confronting himself with many actors and politicians (such as the minister Corrado Clini). He abandoned Twitter in July 2015, leaving the profile unused ever since.

Further offices 

Other than being the current President of the A2A Group, Patuano covers or has covered also the following offices:

 Advisor for the Bocconi Foundation;
 Advisor for the Telecom Italia Foundation;
 Advisor for UPA since July 2012;
 Advisor for Olivetti;
 Advisor for AC Milan;
 President for the "Banco dell'Energia Onlus" since July 2020;

Publications 
 "Il confronto tra le Telco e gli OTT", published on the website ilpost.it.
 "Un nuovo modello di business per le telecomunicazioni", published on Harvard Business Review Italia and republished on Il Sole 24 Ore

References

External links
 

1964 births
A.C. Milan directors
Italian chief executives
Italian economists
Living people